Hemichneumon is a genus of parasitoid wasps belonging to the family Ichneumonidae.

he species of this genus are found in Europe.

Species:
 Hemichneumon subdolus Wesmael, 1857

References

Ichneumonidae
Ichneumonidae genera